The 2012 Chicago Slaughter season was the team's sixth season as a professional indoor football franchise and third in the Indoor Football League (IFL). One of sixteen teams competing in the IFL for the 2012 season, the Hoffman Estates, Illinois-based Chicago Slaughter were members of the United Conference.

Under the leadership of owner Jim McMahon, and head coach Steve McMichael, the team played their home games at the Sears Centre in Hoffman Estates, Illinois.

Schedule
Key:

Regular season
All start times are local time

Postseason

Roster

Standings

References

Chicago Slaughter
Chicago Slaughter seasons
Chicago Slaughter